The Ministry of Magic is the government of the Magical community of Britain in J. K. Rowling's Wizarding World, headed by an official entitled the Minister for Magic. The magical government in Britain is first mentioned in Harry Potter and the Philosopher's Stone; the Ministry makes its first proper appearance in Harry Potter and the Order of the Phoenix (2003). Throughout the books, it is regularly depicted as corrupt, elitist and completely incompetent, with its high-ranking officials blind to ominous events and unwilling to take action against threats to wizard society. Dolores Umbridge was placed at Hogwarts to see what was going on at the school and prevent the news that Lord Voldemort was back from spreading. It reaches a zenith of corruption before being effectively taken over by Voldemort. At the end of the final book, following Voldemort's death, Kingsley Shacklebolt takes over the ministry, changing it for the better. By the time of Harry Potter and the Cursed Child, Hermione Granger is the Minister for Magic.

Composition and status

Connection to Muggle world
Each new Muggle Prime Minister receives a visit from the Minister for Magic, who informs them of the existence of the wizarding world. The Minister explains that they will contact the Prime Minister only in circumstances in which the events of the wizarding world may affect Muggles. For example, the Minister has to inform the Prime Minister if dangerous magical artefacts or animals are to be brought into Britain.

The Ministry keeps in touch with the British Prime Minister via a wizard's portrait in the Prime Minister's office at 10 Downing Street. The portrait, which cannot be removed from the wall (because of a Permanent Sticking Charm in place), notifies the Prime Minister of the Minister for Magic's arrival and, after they have been notified, the Minister for Magic appears in their office via the fireplace which has specifically been hooked up to the Floo Network. The Ministers for Magic who appear in the Harry Potter series, such as Cornelius Fudge and Rufus Scrimgeour, tend to act in a somewhat patronising manner towards the Muggle Prime Minister.

The Ministry government succeeded the earlier "Wizards' Council," the earliest-known form of government for the wizarding world of Harry Potter. According to Pottermore, it was formally established in 1707.

Government structure
In the Harry Potter books, the Ministry's employees appear to be a largely unelected body. The post of Minister itself, however, is stated to be an elected position. Who has the power to elect or dismiss ministers is never explained. Nevertheless, both the Minister and the Ministry as a whole are seen throughout the Harry Potter series to be highly sensitive to (and reliant on) wizard public opinion, which they attempt to influence via wizarding newspapers.  In the books, employment with the Ministry can be obtained right after completion of a wizarding education, though different offices require different levels of education and sometimes specific exam results with some extra training required within the department itself.

Furthermore, the government gives the impression of (at various times) either incompetence or malice. It often appears woefully incompetent, to the point of being unable to detect or prevent an assault on the Department of Mysteries, apparently its most heavily guarded department. Due to lax security, a group of Hogwarts students, as well as Voldemort, a dozen Death Eaters, and the Order of the Phoenix, all of whom were wanted by the government, are able to enter the department on a whim and without provoking any response whatsoever, even signing in as a "rescue mission" without attracting attention. However, these events occur under Cornelius Fudge's reign, a Minister who is renowned in the books as incompetent. Fudge's resignation in the next book is a direct result of these events.

Judicial system and corruption
In the books and films, the wizarding courts have displayed at times, a marked lack of interest in evidence for or against a suspect, even relying on personal prejudice to decide the outcome as quickly as possible. Not all of the accused are even given trials, as in the case of Sirius Black. In Order of the Phoenix, the Ministry is shown to be quite prepared to decree and enforce draconian laws without notice. At times, the Ministry can also seem uninterested in solving serious problems, choosing instead to ignore or cover up bad news. In Harry Potter and the Chamber of Secrets, Fudge takes a long time to respond to the attacks on Hogwarts; and even then is sure that Hagrid is causing the trouble rather than someone else. In the fourth and fifth instalments, Fudge refuses to believe that Lord Voldemort has returned, despite mounting evidence. The Ministry even mounts a campaign to damage Harry Potter's credibility, an effort fuelled in part by Fudge's fear that Albus Dumbledore wants to forcibly remove him from his position.  Eventually, the Ministry is forced to acknowledge the emergency and act on it. Fudge is subsequently removed from office for incompetence and replaced by Rufus Scrimgeour.

When interviewed, Rowling stated that when Harry, Ron and Hermione work for the Ministry, they change it significantly, making it less corrupt.

Departments

Department of Magical Law Enforcement
The Department of Magical Law Enforcement is a combination of police and justice facilities. It is located on the second level of the Ministry of Magic. Bartemius Crouch Sr. once headed the department, prior to the first book.  At the beginning of the series, it is headed by Amelia Bones, who is replaced by Pius Thicknesse after Voldemort murders her. Thicknesse is replaced by Corban Yaxley after Voldemort has Thicknesse appointed the puppet Minister for his regime.  By the events of Cursed Child, Harry Potter has become its head.

According to Rowling, this is the department that Hermione Granger joins, after the events of the seventh book, transferring from the Department for the Regulation and Control of Magical Creatures, where she began her post-Hogwarts career.

Auror Office
The Ministry employs aurors to pursue and apprehend Dark wizards. According to Minerva McGonagall, the Auror Office takes in new recruits with a minimum of 5 N.E.W.T.s (with marks no lower than "Exceeds Expectations"). She suggests that Potions, Defence Against the Dark Arts, Transfiguration, Charms, and Herbology N.E.W.T.s are the most appropriate subjects for someone who aspires to gain admission to the training program. A potential recruit also has to pass "a series of character and aptitude tests." Nymphadora Tonks mentions that the program's courses of study include "Concealment and Disguise" and "Stealth and Tracking," and that the training is hard to pass with high marks.

Aurors in the Harry Potter series include Alastor Moody, Nymphadora Tonks, Kingsley Shacklebolt, John Dawlish, Frank and Alice Longbottom, Rufus Scrimgeour, Gawain Robards, Hesphaestus Gore, Proudfoot, Savage, and Williamson. Harry himself later joins the department, and, according to a Rowling 2007 interview, is eventually promoted to department head.

During the First War against Voldemort, Aurors had authorisation to use the Unforgivable Curses on suspected Death Eaters: that is, they received licence to kill, coerce, and torture them. Many of the Dark criminals in the Harry Potter universe first duel with the aurors sent to arrest them, before finally giving up their freedom. Aurors also operate to protect high-profile targets such as Harry, Hogwarts, and the Muggle prime minister –  in Harry Potter and the Order of the Phoenix auror Kingsley Shacklebolt worked secretly in the Muggle Prime Minister's security detail.

Improper Use of Magic Office
The Improper Use of Magic Office is responsible for investigating offences under the Decree for the Reasonable Restriction of Underage Sorcery and the International Confederation of Wizards' Statute of Secrecy. They regulate an underage wizard's or witch's use of magic and prohibit wizards and witches from performing magic in the presence of Muggles or in a Muggle-inhabited area in the Harry Potter universe. An enchantment called "the Trace" is placed upon children and helps the department detect offences; it breaks when they reach the age of 17. However, Dumbledore explains to Harry that the Ministry cannot tell who exactly uses magic in a given area, only that it has been used. This can be seen as unfair to young witches and wizards who grew up in the Muggle world (such as Muggle-born wizards, or those with one magical and one Muggle parent) as they are more likely to be caught using magic than those who grow up in the wizarding world. Those living in the Muggle world generally have no contact with other witches or wizards away from school, and the Ministry simply presumes that any magic performed where they are is an act of underage wizardry, while at the same time presuming that any magic performed in a wizard home that has minors present was performed by those aged 17 and over. This means that minors living in the wizard world have a much greater chance of escaping punishment for the use of underage magic. The Ministry has to rely on wizard and witch parents to enforce the ban on under-age magic within their homes.

It is not known how or when the Trace is placed upon a child, though it may be assumed that it begins either when the child begins to show magical talent or when they first go through the barrier to Platform 9¾. The Ministry seemingly ignores the Trace during the school year as students at Hogwarts are expected to perform magic and are under the supervision of teachers. This 'blind eye' also seems to be extended to places such as Diagon Alley, Platform 9¾, the Hogwarts Express and the village of Hogsmeade (the only settlement in Britain inhabited solely by wizards and other magical beings), which is located close to Hogwarts and which 3rd year students and above can visit on weekends provided they have a signed permission slip from their parent or guardian. The Ministry also seems to turn a blind eye to the use of magic in the Muggle world when the child is under the age of 11, as their powers have generally not been developed enough to cause a problem. A number of witches and wizards, including Harry Potter, Hermione Granger, Lily Evans, and Severus Snape all known to have performed some underage magic while growing up in the Muggle world that went unpunished.

After Harry's first minor violation – a Hover charm that was actually performed by Dobby the House-elf – he is merely warned. His second violation, inflating Aunt Marge, is forgiven by Fudge because the Minister fears that Sirius Black is after Harry, and feels that his safety after running away from the Dursleys takes precedence. After his third offence (creating a Patronus to protect himself and Dudley from two Dementors), the letter sent to him states that he is expelled from school; that representatives will arrive at his home to destroy his wand; and that he is required to appear at a disciplinary hearing given that the offence occurred after he had already received one warning. Dumbledore reminds Fudge that the Ministry doesn't have the power to expel students from Hogwarts, or to confiscate wands without benefit of a hearing.

At Harry's hearing, he is tried by the entire Wizengamot court and cleared of all charges thanks to Dumbledore's intervention. Such proceedings are highly unusual, however. For a simple case of underage use of magic, Harry was originally supposed to be interviewed solely by Amelia Bones, head of the Department of Magical Law Enforcement.

The only known worker at the office is Mafalda Hopkirk.

Wizengamot
The Wizengamot serves as the wizard high court of law, from the words "wizard", and "Witenagemot", which was a council of powerful people summoned to advise and appoint kings in Anglo-Saxon England. That word derives from the Old English for "meeting of wise men" (witan – wise man or counsellor / gemot – assembly)

In Order of the Phoenix, about fifty people are present at Harry Potter's hearing, wearing plum-coloured robes embroidered with a silver "W" on the left-hand side of the chest. During the hearing, the Minister for Magic sits in the middle of the front row and conducts most of the interrogation, while Percy Weasley (the Junior Undersecretary), acts as stenographer. Other officials seen at the Wizengamot include the Senior Undersecretary to the Minister and the Head of the Department of Magical Law Enforcement.

Dumbledore has long – for about 50 years – held the position of Chief Warlock of the Wizengamot. He was removed at the beginning of the Order of the Phoenix novel and reinstated at the end. He remained in that post for one year, until his death at the end of Half-Blood Prince.

Other offices
Other offices include the Magical Law Enforcement Squad, which pursues day-to-day law offences; the Misuse of Muggle Artefacts Office, headed by Perkins, and the job in which the reader first sees Arthur Weasley; and the Detection and Confiscation of Counterfeit Defensive Spells and Protective Objects Office, created by Rufus Scrimgeour in Harry Potter and the Half-Blood Prince, into which Mr Weasley is promoted, to be its head.

Department of Magical Accidents and Catastrophes
The Department of Magical Accidents and Catastrophes is responsible for repairing accidental magical damage in the world of Harry Potter. It is located on the third level of the Ministry of Magic and houses the following offices:
 The Accidental Magic Reversal Squad is a squad of wizards whose job it is to reverse "accidental magic." These accidents are normally caused by young witches and wizards who have not learned to control their magic. They may also be caused by older wizards out of control, or severe, unintentional effects of charms or spells, such as splinching (in Apparition when a wizard or witch is split with one part remaining at the point of origin, and the rest of the wizard at the destination). For instance, two members of the Accidental Magic Reversal Squad were sent out in the Harry Potter and the Prisoner of Azkaban book and movie when Harry Potter inflated Aunt Marge; they "deflated" her and erased her memory of the inflation (the memory modification done by Obliviators).
 The Obliviator Headquarters. "Obliviator" is the designation for a Ministry of Magic employee who has the task of modifying the memory of a Muggle who witnesses incidents belonging to the Wizarding world. They are first called so in the sixth volume, although the practice is mentioned in the previous novels: any wizard can modify memories in the Harry Potter books by using the spell "Obliviate". In contrast to the incompetence displayed by the Ministry as a whole, the Obliviators appear to perform their task with a near-perfect success rate, keeping the Muggle world completely oblivious to the existence of the Wizarding World. They were sent out in the third book when after they deflated Aunt Marge, they erased her memory of the incident.
 The Muggle-Worthy Excuse Committee explains any major magical accidents to the Muggles by creating a non-magical reason for the accident. For example, Peter Pettigrew killed twelve Muggle bystanders and tore apart the street (so as to reach the sewer pipe and escape) by means of an immense explosion curse during his altercation with Sirius Black. The massive and obvious damage and mortality was explained by the committee as due to a tragic accidental explosion of the gas main.

Department for the Regulation and Control of Magical Creatures
As noted in Fantastic Beasts and Where to Find Them, the Department for the Regulation and Control of Magical Creatures is divided into three divisions (the Beast Division, the Being Division, and the Spirit Division) and contains the Goblin Liaison Office and Centaur Liaison Office, though the centaurs, being isolationists, have never interacted with the office since its creation. Thus, "being sent to the Centaur Office" has become a euphemism at the Ministry for those about to be fired. For further detail on the distinctions between these divisions, see Regulation and classification of Magical creatures. It is also noted that Hermione began her post-Hogwarts career here before transferring to the Department of Magical Law Enforcement in this office. It is located on the fourth level of the Ministry of Magic.

Department of International Magical Cooperation
The Department of International Magical Cooperation is an agency that attempts to get wizards from different countries to co-operate in wizarding actions both political and public. This department on the fifth level of the Ministry of Magic includes the headquarters of the International Magical Trading Standards Body, the International Magical Office of Law, and the British seats of the International Confederation of Wizards. The former head was Barty Crouch Sr., until his death. This is also where Percy Weasley began his Ministry career.

This department is similar in function to the real-life Foreign and Commonwealth Office of the United Kingdom, and various organs of the United Nations. Among the duties of the Department of International Magical Cooperation are:
 Work with magical governments of other countries
 Set standards for trade
 Create regulations for things like cauldron thickness
 Work with Department of Magical Games and Sports on the Triwizard Tournament
 International Confederation of Wizards, British Seats

Department of Magical Transportation
The Department of Magical Transportation is responsible for various aspects of magical transport. It is located on the sixth level of the Ministry of Magic and includes the following offices: the Floo Network Authority, responsible for setting up and maintaining the network, and distributing the greenish floo powder; the Broom Regulatory Control, that controls the traffic of broom travel; the Portkey Office, the regulation of Portkeys; and the Apparition Test Centre, that grants licences to witches and wizards so that they can apparate.

Department of Magical Games and Sports
The Department of Magical Games and Sports, seen as the most relaxed department (posters for favourite Quidditch teams are found tacked to the walls), deals with organising sports events like the Quidditch World Cup and the Triwizard Tournament. Ludo Bagman used to be the Head of Department here, but his gambling problem forced him to flee from Goblin creditors. The department is located on the seventh level of the Ministry of Magic, and includes the British and Irish Quidditch League Headquarters, Official Gobstones Club, and the Ludicrous Patents Office – other sports and games-related aspects of the Harry Potter world.

Department of Mysteries
The Department of Mysteries, located on Level Nine, is a department in the Ministry of Magic which studies particular enigmas (death, time, space, thought, and love) and stores copies of prophecies made in the Harry Potter universe. During Voldemort's discriminatory regime, he forces the department to lie and claim that Muggle-borns actually steal magic from Pure-bloods, making them "illegal magicals" and allowing their arrest.

Because of the covert nature surrounding this particular branch of the Wizarding government, the Department of Mysteries can be likened to real-world intelligence agencies like the CIA or MI6 in that most of their operations are kept in total secrecy from the general wizard populace. However, the primary operations of the department seem to be more like those of scientists as they attempt to uncover the sources and rules that govern magic.

The rooms at the Department each seem (although not spelled out directly) to refer to various mysteries of life. These rooms include:

Unspeakables
The Unspeakables are the group of wizards who work in the Department of Mysteries (their identities classified for security reasons). Known Unspeakables include Broderick Bode, Croaker, and Augustus Rookwood who is a Death Eater.

Ministry officials

The following characters are notable Ministry of Magic officials. Arthur Weasley, Kingsley Shacklebolt and Nymphadora Tonks are listed under Order of the Phoenix. Yaxley is listed under Death Eaters.

Ludo Bagman
Ludovic "Ludo" Bagman is a retired professional Quidditch player, formerly a highly successful Beater for the Wimbourne Wasps and England's international team, whose good looks have gone a bit to seed; his nose is squashed in (apparently having been broken by a stray Bludger) and he is quite a bit thicker around the middle than he was in his Quidditch days. He was the head of the Department of Magical Games and Sports. Rowling uses Dumbledore's Pensieve to reveal in Harry Potter and the Goblet of Fire that Bagman was accused of being a Death Eater about thirteen years before the events of the fourth book because he had given information to recently discovered Death Eater Augustus Rookwood. It is stated that he had believed Rookwood, who was his father's friend, to be beyond suspicion, and that, consequently, he had thought that he was aiding the Ministry by passing the information on to him.

Bagman loves gambling, which got him in financial trouble so severe that he pays some of his creditors (including Fred and George Weasley) with disappearing Leprechaun Gold, after they have gambled on the Quidditch World Cup. After the World Cup final, some goblins corner him in the woods outside the stadium and take all the gold he had on him, which is not enough to cover his debts. To clear his debts with the goblins, Bagman makes a bet on the Triwizard Tournament, of which he is one of the judges. He bets the goblins that Harry would win. He tries to help Harry over the course of the Tournament, giving him a perfect score in the First Task even though he is injured, and offering him advice. Harry and Cedric Diggory end up tying for first place in the tournament, and Bagman does not win the bet as the goblins argue that Bagman was betting Harry would win outright. Bagman runs away after the Third Task of the Tournament.

Bagman's character was cut from the film adaptation of the fourth book. Some of Ludo's primary functions in the story were performed by Cornelius Fudge and Barty Crouch Sr., in the film adaptation. Bagman appears in the Harry Potter: Quidditch World Cup video game as a Quidditch announcer.

Barty Crouch Sr
Bartemius "Barty" Crouch Sr. was the head of the Department of Magical Law Enforcement when Voldemort first came to power. Crouch was somewhat megalomaniacal and intensely preoccupied with presenting the appearance of respectability. Crouch was a narrow, inflexible man who stiffly followed the rules. Though he despised the Dark Arts, the lengths to which he was willing to go to disassociate with anything that might blemish his reputation led him to behave almost as cruelly as many on the Dark Side, and gave Aurors powers to kill rather than capture suspected Death Eaters who resisted arrest. He sent Sirius Black to the wizard prison Azkaban without a trial. Crouch appeared to be the favourite to become the next Minister for Magic until his son, Barty Crouch Jr., was caught with the Lestranges, Death Eaters who were assisting Voldemort's rise to power and who had tortured Neville's parents with the Cruciatus Curse. Crouch gave his son a trial before sending him to Azkaban; however, according to Sirius, the trial was a sham, merely a public demonstration of how much he hated the boy. The public were sympathetic to Crouch Jr., and placed all the blame on Crouch Sr., accusing him of driving his son to join the Death Eaters because of his parental neglect. After the trial, Crouch lost much of his popularity and any chance he had of becoming Minister of Magic, and he was shunted sideways to a post as the head of the Department of International Magical Cooperation.

About a year after the trial, Crouch's terminally ill wife begged for her son's life to be saved, so Crouch abetted the two in trading appearances using Polyjuice Potion. Mrs. Crouch died as Crouch Jr. in Azkaban, while Crouch Sr. subsequently used the Imperius Curse to keep Crouch Jr. under house arrest. When Bertha Jorkins discovered the truth, Crouch Sr. silenced her with a powerful Memory Charm that permanently damaged her memory. 

Crouch Sr. makes his first appearance in the series at the Quidditch World Cup in Goblet of Fire, when he attends the Quidditch World Cup with his house elf  Winky as well as Crouch Jr., who is hidden under an Invisibility Cloak. Due to Winky's fear of heights, Crouch Jr. is able to slip away and steals Harry's wand to conjure the Dark Mark. When Winky is subsequently caught by Amos Diggory with Harry's wand, Crouch Sr. angrily dismisses Winky on the spot for failing to keep his son under control, as it was her idea to let Crouch Jr. attend. 

Shortly thereafter, Voldemort and Peter Pettigrew show up at the Crouch family home, having found out about Crouch Jr. from interrogating Jorkins. Voldemort places Crouch Sr. under the Imperius Curse, freeing Crouch Jr from the Imperius Curse placed on him by his father, and forces Crouch to continue to appear in public as if there is nothing wrong. While still under the Imperius Curse, Crouch Sr. acts as one of the five judges at the Triwizard Tournament. However, worried that Crouch will fight off the effects of the Imperius Curse, Voldemort later has him imprisoned within his own house and has him communicate exclusively through supervised owl post. Despite this precaution, Crouch manages to break free of the Imperius Curse, and makes his way to Hogwarts, hoping to warn Dumbledore of what is happening, running into Harry and Viktor Krum in the Forbidden Forest. However, while Harry is on his way to summon Dumbledore, he unwittingly alerts Crouch Jr., who is using Polyjuice Potion to impersonate Mad-Eye Moody, to his father's presence. Crouch Jr. immediately goes to the forest, stuns Krum,  kills his own father, transfigures the body into a bone, and buries it on the Hogwarts grounds.

Roger Lloyd-Pack appeared as Crouch Sr. in the film adaptation of Harry Potter and the Goblet of Fire. His apathetic condemnation of his son pleading for mercy is changed to his son openly outing himself as a Death Eater due to Karkaroff's accusations, with Crouch being heartbroken about having to put him in jail. His abusive custody and mind-control of Crouch Jr. is omitted entirely, as is his dismissal of Winky as she is not included in the films. In addition, his body is found by Harry in the woods near the Hogwarts grounds, rather than buried by Crouch Jr.

John Dawlish
John Dawlish is an Auror. He is very capable and self-assured, and is described as a "tough-looking wizard" with "very short, wiry" grey hair. He leaves Hogwarts with Outstandings in all his N.E.W.T.s (Nastily Exhausting Wizarding Test). However, it is a running joke of the books that in any appearance or mention of him, he is eventually hexed, usually due to a combination of far superior opponents and sheer bad luck.

In Harry Potter and the Order of the Phoenix, Dawlish accompanies Fudge to Hogwarts to confront Harry about the secret Dumbledore's Army meetings. Dawlish is knocked out along with Fudge, Umbridge, and Kingsley when Dumbledore, who takes all the blame for the Army on himself, escapes. A few weeks later, Dawlish is among the wizards who attempt to arrest Rubeus Hagrid when Umbridge sacks the gamekeeper. Still later, Dawlish arrives at the Ministry of Magic with Fudge after the battle at the Department of Mysteries is over. Fudge then sends him to attend to the captured Death Eaters. Dawlish appears again in Half-Blood Prince guarding Hogwarts after the commencement of the Second War. He is sent to follow Dumbledore when the Headmaster leaves school to search for Voldemort's Horcruxes, but is "regretfully" hexed by the Headmaster. He is Confunded by an Order member early on in Harry Potter and the Deathly Hallows, and gives Death Eater Corban Yaxley false information on Harry's removal from the Dursleys' home. Being Confunded, he is defeated by Dirk Cresswell, who escapes halfway on the way to Azkaban. Later, Dawlish is sent to arrest Augusta Longbottom. After a struggle, her defence places Dawlish in St Mungo's Hospital.

Dawlish's first name is not revealed in the books or films. However, Rowling said in an interview with the podcast "PotterCast" that she named him John, owing to host John Noe's appreciation of the character.

Dawlish was portrayed by Richard Leaf in the film adaptation of Harry Potter and the Order of the Phoenix.

Cornelius Fudge
Cornelius Oswald Fudge is first mentioned in Harry Potter and the Philosopher's Stone as the Minister for Magic of the United Kingdom. He makes his first appearance in Harry Potter and the Chamber of Secrets when he arrives at the school to take Hagrid to Azkaban, even though he does not firmly believe that Hagrid is guilty. He also removes Dumbledore as Headmaster when pressured by Lucius Malfoy who insisted that all the school governors had voted on it. However, it is not until Harry Potter and the Prisoner of Azkaban that Fudge meets Harry for the first time. Fudge does not press charges against Harry for accidentally inflating Aunt Marge, and advises him to be careful because an escaped convict is at large. When Fudge goes for a social drink at the Three Broomsticks pub, he inadvertently tells an unseen Harry that Sirius was James Potter's best friend and was believed to have betrayed the Potters to Voldemort. Fudge allowed the near-execution of Buckbeak to occur, once again intimidated by Lucius Malfoy. In this book, it is revealed that, before becoming Minister for Magic, he worked in the Department of Magical Accidents and Catastrophes.

His kindly relationship to Harry abruptly changes in Goblet of Fire. When Harry emerges from the Triwizard Tournament's third task after having seen the rebirth of Voldemort, Fudge refuses to believe it. He is worried about the fallout of announcing Voldemort's return, marking the end of the Wizarding world's years of peace, and the sudden outbreak of gloom and terror; hence he decides to merely ignore all of the evidence rather than accept the truth. J. K. Rowling has since stated that Fudge's behaviour mirrors that of Neville Chamberlain in the lead-up to World War II.

In Order of the Phoenix, Fudge orchestrates a vicious smear campaign through the Daily Prophet to present Dumbledore as a senile old fool (even though he was constantly asking for Dumbledore's advice in his early days of being Minister for Magic) and Harry as an unstable, attention-seeking liar. He also passes a law allowing him to place Dolores Umbridge, his Senior Undersecretary, as a teacher at Hogwarts. He then appoints Umbridge as Hogwarts' "High Inquisitor", with the power to inspect and sack teachers, and ultimately Dumbledore's successor as Headmaster, which gives her (and by extension, Fudge himself) primary control of how Hogwarts is managed. Fudge is concerned that Dumbledore is a threat to his power and that he is planning to train the Hogwarts students to overthrow the Ministry. 

After Voldemort appears in the Ministry of Magic at the Battle of the Department of Mysteries, Fudge finally admits that Voldemort has returned. He is ousted by the wizarding community for his failure to announce the return of Voldemort immediately after the Triwizard Competition; for discrediting Harry Potter and Albus Dumbledore; and for installing Dolores Umbridge as Headmistress of Hogwarts. He is replaced by Rufus Scrimgeour, though he stays on as a powerless advisor and messenger to the Prime Minister in Half-Blood Prince. 

Prior to his dismissal, he seeks Harry’s support in giving the wizarding community the impression that the Ministry is winning the war, but Dumbledore and Harry both refuse to even consider it. Fudge is last mentioned in the series as one of the attendees at Dumbledore's funeral. His fate during Voldemort's takeover of the Ministry during the following year is unknown.

Fudge was portrayed by Robert Hardy in the film series.

Bertha Jorkins
Bertha Jorkins was a student at Hogwarts at the same time as James Potter and company. She was nosy with a good head for gossip, but also very absent-minded. She became a Ministry of Magic employee after leaving Hogwarts. In the summer before the events of Harry Potter and the Goblet of Fire, she was killed by Voldemort. Rowling later revealed that her death was used to turn Nagini, Voldemort's snake, into a Horcrux. Some months before her murder, she accidentally discovered that Barty Crouch Jr., who supposedly died in Azkaban prison, was still alive and being hidden by his father. Barty Crouch Sr. silenced her with a powerful Memory Charm, which made her a little befuddled. Voldemort irreparably damaged her mentally and physically while breaking the Memory Charm, through which he gained information about the Triwizard Tournament and Crouch Jr.. During the duel between Harry and Voldemort in the graveyard at Little Hangleton, Bertha is one of the shadows that spills out from Voldemort's wand and helps Harry escape. She appears to be wiser after her death, and supports Harry during The Goblet of Fire so he can defeat Voldemort, her murderer.

Rufus Scrimgeour
Rufus Scrimgeour serves as the Minister for Magic of the United Kingdom from Harry Potter and the Half-Blood Prince until his death in the following book, succeeding Cornelius Fudge. He is described as looking like an old lion with tawny hair and bushy eyebrows, yellow eyes and wire-rimmed spectacles. Before being selected as minister, Scrimgeour headed the Auror Office of the Ministry and he is heavily battle-scarred from his years of service as an Auror, giving him an appearance of shrewd toughness. As the Minister, he visits the Muggle Prime Minister with Fudge, now an advisor, to inform him about recent wizarding events, crucial to internal security.

Scrimgeour, however tough he looked, was no better than Fudge. He (and the rest of the Ministry) was more concerned about the Ministry's reputation than seeing the danger the Death Eaters and Voldemort posed to the wizarding world. He tried to make it look like the Ministry was making progress by covering up breakouts from Azkaban and arresting random suspects like Stan Shunpike. He also sought to raise the wizarding population's morale by asking Harry, who has been labelled as the "Chosen One", to be seen visiting the Ministry, so that the public would believe that Harry supports the Ministry's actions against Voldemort. This becomes a source of contention between the Minister and Dumbledore, who does not support this idea. Harry also rejects that role, primarily because of his own antagonistic history with the Ministry and because of the Ministry's treatment of Dumbledore and innocents like  Stan Shunpike. 

Scrimgeour makes a short appearance, looking tired and grim due to the pressures of his position, in Harry Potter and the Deathly Hallows at The Burrow, apparently as executor of Dumbledore's will. A final argument promptly breaks out with Harry over Dumbledore's bequests, his refusal to cooperate with the Ministry, and the Ministry's scapegoating of wizards guilty of no crime.

Scrimgeour is assassinated shortly after the visit, when the Death Eaters take over the Ministry. He is rumoured to have been tortured for Harry's whereabouts by Ministry officials under the control of the Imperius Curse before he is killed. Harry felt a "rush of gratitude" to hear that Scrimgeour, in his final act, attempted to protect Harry by refusing to disclose his location. With the Ministry in the Death Eaters' hands, the official line for Scrimgeour's death is that he resigned.

Bill Nighy played Scrimgeour in Harry Potter and the Deathly Hallows – Part 1, in which he is portrayed as Welsh and a more compassionate character.

Pius Thicknesse
Pius Thicknesse is first introduced in Harry Potter and the Deathly Hallows. He is the Head of the Department of Magical Law Enforcement at the start of the book, when he is placed under the Imperius Curse by Corban Yaxley, who uses his position to infiltrate the senior ranks of the Ministry. Thicknesse is described as a man with long hair and a beard, which are mostly black but tinged with some grey, along with a great overhanging forehead and glinting eyes. Harry's immediate impression is of "a crab looking out from beneath a rock."

After the coup in which Scrimgeour is killed, the Ministry comes under the de facto control of Voldemort, who appoints Thicknesse as his puppet Minister. Thicknesse joins the ranks of the Death Eaters for the rest of the book and fights with them at the Battle of Hogwarts, where he duels against Percy Weasley, who resigns mid-duel. Following the end of the battle, the Imperius Curse that was placed upon him is broken. Kingsley Shacklebolt replaces him as interim (later permanent) Minister for Magic. Not much is known about the "real" nature of Thicknesse, as he has been under the control of Yaxley for nearly the entire book.

Guy Henry plays Thicknesse in Harry Potter and the Deathly Hallows – Part 1 and Part 2, in which he is depicted as a Death Eater even before Scrimgeour's death. In Part 2, Thicknesse is killed by Voldemort.

Dolores Umbridge

Dolores Jane Umbridge was the Defence Against the Dark Arts teacher during Harry Potter's fifth year, the Senior Undersecretary to the Minister of Magic, and the main antagonist in Harry Potter and the Order of the Phoenix. She is a short, squat woman described as resembling a large pale toad, with "short, curly, mouse-brown hair". She speaks with a quiet, childish, high-pitched voice, and loves kittens, chocolate cakes, biscuits, tea and other related paraphernalia, decorating her surroundings in the same manner. She has a tendency to speak to people she feels are her lessers in a very condescending tone, as if they are simpletons or very young children. Besides Voldemort, she is the only other character in the series to leave a lasting scar on Harry's body.

Percy Weasley 
Percy Ignatius Weasley is the third son of Arthur and Molly Weasley. In direct contrast to his brothers, he is a stickler for rules and often pompous due to his love of authority, though he does have good intentions at heart. When readers first meet Percy in Harry Potter and the Philosopher's Stone, he is a Gryffindor prefect, and in Harry Potter and the Prisoner of Azkaban, he becomes Head Boy, much to his mother's delight. In both these circumstances, he becomes physically attached to his badge, wanting to polish it and wear it even when out of school. In Harry Potter and the Chamber of Secrets, Percy secretly has a girlfriend – Ravenclaw prefect Penelope Clearwater. Academically a high-performing student, Percy received twelve OWLs and twelve NEWTs. When he finished school, this academic distinction plus his having served as Head Boy secured him a job in the Ministry in Harry Potter and the Goblet of Fire. His immediate supervisor is Barty Crouch Sr.; Percy somewhat idolises Mr Crouch, but Crouch never seems to remember Percy's name, calling him "Weatherby." When Crouch is ill, Percy replaces him as a judge in the second Triwizard Tournament task. He gave up his family time for a better position as an assistant to the Minister for Magic.

In Harry Potter and the Order of the Phoenix, Percy is promoted to Junior Assistant to Minister Fudge. Since this is an unusually high-ranking position for someone of Percy's age to hold, Arthur suspects that Percy's promotion was not earned but instead given to him to allow the Ministry to better manipulate the Weasleys. Outraged and hurt by the suggestion, Percy violently argues with Arthur, resulting in Percy's subsequent alienation from his family. Although Harry notes he has always liked Percy "the least of Ron's brothers", he is still shocked to hear of this. When Percy learns Ron is made a prefect, he sends him a letter congratulating him for following in his footsteps, and unsuccessfully urges Ron to sever ties with Harry (claiming Harry is an extreme danger to Ron's prefect status), and to pay loyalty to Umbridge and the Ministry – going so far to refer to her as a "delightful woman," much to Harry's and Ron's disgust. Percy later makes an appearance in Harry Potter and the Half-Blood Prince, where he has apparently seen the error of his ways and pays an awkward visit to his family with new Minister Rufus Scrimgeour during the Christmas Holidays, although it is later revealed that this was engineered by Scrimgeour to speak to Harry alone. He later attends Dumbledore's funeral with Ministry officials, including Dolores Umbridge.

In the climax of Harry Potter and the Deathly Hallows, Percy returns to his family and manages to make up with all of them, and eventually duels new Minister for Magic and Voldemort puppet Pius Thicknesse in the Battle of Hogwarts. While dueling Thicknesse, Percy announces that he is resigning, the first joke he has made in many years, much to Fred's delight. While dueling alongside Percy, he witnesses the death of his brother, Fred Weasley, at the hands of Augustus Rookwood, and Percy clings to the corpse and shields it from further damage. In the last part of the battle, he and his father work together to defeat Thicknesse. His final appearance is in the book's epilogue, at King's Cross Station, talking loudly about broom regulations.

Percy is portrayed by Chris Rankin in the film series.

Others

Reception

In connection with her portrayal of the bureaucratised Ministry of Magic and the oppressive measures taken by the Ministry in the later books (like making attendance to Hogwarts compulsory and the "registration of Muggle-borns" with the Ministry), Rowling has been asked whether there is a parallel with Nazism. She replied that "It wasn't really exclusively that. I think you can see in the Ministry even before it's taken over, there are parallels to regimes we all know and love." Jennifer Barnett of People's Weekly World stated that the reader is drawn "into the politics of the wizarding world—the 'Educational Decrees' from the toad-like Ministry of Magic representative, the high-level connections of 'war criminals' from the last rise of Voldemort, the prejudice against 'mudbloods' and 'half-breeds,'" and suggested connections "to the world we live in, to the similarities and differences between the Fudge administration and the Bush administration." Julia Turner of Slate Magazine also interpreted Rowling's depiction of the ministration as criticism of the Bush and Blair administrations, suggesting the Ministry's security pamphlet recalls the Operation TIPS (Terrorism Information and Prevention System). University of Tennessee law professor Benjamin Barton notes what he considers to be libertarian aspects of Harry Potter in his paper "Harry Potter and the Half-Crazed Bureaucracy", published in the Michigan Law Review, stating that "Rowling's scathing portrait of government is surprisingly strident and effective. This is partly because her critique works on so many levels: the functions of government, the structure of government, and the bureaucrats who run the show. All three elements work together to depict a Ministry of Magic run by self-interested bureaucrats bent on increasing and protecting their power, often to the detriment of the public at large. In other words, Rowling creates a public-interest scholar's dream—or nightmare—government."

In popular culture
One of the most influential Wizard rock bands is named Ministry of Magic after the government structure in the series. Ministry of Magic has made numerous performances, amongst the most notable of them taking place in Wrockstock.

References

External links

 The HP-Lexicon talks about the various departments in the Ministry of Magic
 Mugglenet page on the Ministry of Magic
Wizarding World page on the Ministry of Magic

Fictional elements introduced in 2003
Fictional governments
Fictional politicians
Harry Potter organisations
Bureaucracy in fiction